The 2016 Formula D season is the thirteenth season of the Formula D Pro Championship series and third season of the Pro2 series. The Pro Championship series began on April 8 at Long Beach and ended on October 8 at Irwindale Speedway with Chris Forsberg winning his third Pro Championship. The Pro2 series began on May 5 at Road Atlanta and ended on October 1 at Wild Horse Motorsports Park with Marc Landreville winning the series.

Schedule and results

Calendar changes & notes
 The Super Drift Challenge took place on April 15 & 16 at the Streets of Long Beach course, with Matt Field beating Michael Essa in the final round.

Entries

Pro championship

Pro 2

Results and standings

Pro championship

Standings
Event winners in bold.

Notes:
X — Did not attend event

Manufacturer Cup

Tire Cup

Pro 2

Standings

Notes:
X — Did not attend event

References

External links
 

Formula D seasons
Formula D